Middleburg Heights is a city and a suburb of Cleveland in Cuyahoga County, Ohio, United States.  The population held steady at approximately sixteen thousand throughout the first two decades of the twenty-first century.

Government
Middleburg Heights has a mayor and council form of government. The mayor is a non-voting member of the city council.

Matthew Castelli became mayor on 8 January 2019 filling the vacancy created when Gary Starr resigned. Starr announced his resignation on 27 November 2018 after having served in that position for 37 years.

History
Middleburg Heights is part of the historic Connecticut Western Reserve, which the State of Connecticut "Reserved" for their own purposes when in 1786 Connecticut relinquished claim to some of its western lands and ceded them to the new Federal Government. The first European settlers to the area that became Middleburg Township were Jared Hickcox and his family. They were originally from Waterbury, Connecticut.

The Village of Middleburg Heights was established in 1928.

Geography

Demographics

2010 census
At the 2010 census, there were 15,946 people, 7,114 households and 4,234 families living in the city. The racial makeup of the city was 91.1% White, 1.6% African American, 0.2% Native American, 5.6% Asian, 0.6% from other races, and 0.9% from two or more races. Hispanic or Latino of any race were 2.2% of the population.

There were 7,114 households, of which 22.8% had children under the age of 18 living with them, 46.6% were married couples living together, 9.4% had a female householder with no husband present, 3.5% had a male householder with no wife present, and 40.5% were non-families. 35.3% of all households were made up of individuals, and 13.9% had someone living alone who was 65 years of age or older. The average household size was 2.18 and the average family size was 2.84.

The median age was 46.6 years. 17.5% of residents were under the age of 18; 6.7% were between the ages of 18 and 24; 23.5% were from 25 to 44; 29.2% were from 45 to 64; and 23.1% were 65 years of age or older. The gender makeup of the city was 47.3% male and 52.7% female.

2000 census
At the 2000 census, there were 15,542 people, 6,705 households and 4,257 families living in the city. The population density was 1,924.8 per square mile (743.6/km). There were 7,094 housing units at an average density of 878.6 per square mile (339.4/km). The racial makeup of the city was 94.63% White, 1.33% African American, 0.15% Native American, 2.26% Asian, 0.07% Pacific Islander, 0.28% from other races, and 1.28% from two or more races. Hispanic or Latino of any race were 1.27% of the population.

There were 6,705 households, of which 21.4% had children under the age of 18 living with them, 52.0% were married couples living together, 8.2% had a female householder with no husband present, and 36.5% were non-families. 31.8% of all households were made up of individuals, and 11.8% had someone living alone who was 65 years of age or older. The average household size was 2.25 and the average family size was 2.84.

17.7% of the population were under the age of 18, 7.3% from 18 to 24, 27.7% from 25 to 44, 25.7% from 45 to 64, and 21.7% who were 65 years of age or older. The median age was 43 years. For every 100 females, there were 90.1 males. For every 100 females age 18 and over, there were 87.9 males.

The median household income was $47,893 and the median family income was $60,015. Males had a median income of $44,707 compared with $28,608 for females. The per capita income was $25,201. About 2.0% of families and 3.0% of the population were below the poverty line, including 2.2% of those under age 18 and 2.6% of those age 65 or over.

References

External links

 Official website
 Middleburg Heights and Middleburg Township from The Encyclopedia of Cleveland History

Cities in Ohio
Cities in Cuyahoga County, Ohio
Populated places established in 1809
Cleveland metropolitan area